The Central Squares of Moscow consists of a chain of squares around the historical Moscow Kremlin and Kitai-gorod areas of central Moscow, Russia, following the historical and now mostly razed down Kitai-gorod wall. These squares and avenues connecting them form the innermost ring road in Moscow open to regular traffic. The names of central squares changed frequently for political reasons and as a result of urban redevelopment; some of these squares are actually city streets (Staraya Square, Novaya Square); other locations are shaped like squares, but have no names of their own.

List 
This is a list of the Central Squares and their connecting avenues, clockwise from Bolshoy Kamenny Bridge:
 Borovitskaya Square
 Manege Street (inner ring, closed to traffic) and Mokhovaya Street (outer ring)
 Manezhnaya Square, Moscow
 Okhotny Ryad Street
 Revolution Square, Moscow (inner ring) and Theatre Square (outer ring)
 Teatralny Lane
 Lubyanka Square
 Novaya Square (inner ring) and Lubyansky Lane (outer ring)
 Ilyinka Gates Square
 Staraya Square (inner ring, closed to traffic), Kitaisky Lane (inner ring) and Lubyansky Lane (outer ring)
 Slavyanskaya Square
 Varvarka Gates Square
 Kitaigorodsky Lane

References
 History of renaming squares prior to 1947: Russian: П.В.Сытин, "Из истории московских улиц", М, 1948, pp. 35–67
 Present-day naming convention: City of Moscow decree N.958, 25.10.1994 text in Russian
 Architectural landmarks on Central Squares: Bilingual: "Monuments of architecture of Moscow. Kremlin, Kitai-gorod and Central Squares", Moscow, Iskusstvo, 1977

Ring roads in Moscow